The Special Action Force (SAF) is the elite unit of the Philippine National Police founded by Fidel V. Ramos, later the twelfth president of the Philippines.

History
Formed on May 12, 1983, by the now-defunct Philippine Constabulary (PC) as the Philippine Constabulary Special Action Force (PCSAF) as per PC General Orders 323. The creation of the SAF was inspired by and "formed along the lines of" the British Army's Special Air Service (SAS). Fidel Ramos and Renato de Villa were the founders of the unit. De Villa directed Rosendo Ferrer and Avelino "Sonny" Razon Jr. to organize a Special Action Force. After which, a training program called the PCSAF Ranger Course, was used to train the 1st generation of SAF troopers, which had a number of 149 troopers. Out of them, 26 were commissioned officers with the others being enlisted personnel from a wide range of PC units such as the PC Brigade, the Long Range Patrol Battalion (LRP), the K-9 Support Company, PC Special Organized Group, the Light Reaction Unit (LRU) of PC MetroCom, the PC Off-Shore Action Command (COSAC) and other PC Units. Later on, they changed the name of the course to SAF Operations Course (SAFOC) then SAF Commando Course (SAFCC).

Initially formed to battle against New People's Army and Moro National Liberation Front guerrillas in the late 1980s and early 1990s, their tasks have been expanded to battle against organized criminal groups, terrorists, guerrillas and common criminals.

During the days of the EDSA Revolution in late February 1986, Ramos was involved in planning an operation called "Exercise Ligtas Isla" ("Exercise Save Island") in case either First Lady Imelda Marcos or Armed Forces of the Philippines Chief of Staff General Fabián Ver would take over as ruler from President Marcos, who had already been ill by that time. When Corazon Aquino acceded to the presidency, the SAF were mandated to be on standby due to the several coup attempts by rogue Philippine soldiers throughout her rule.

On January 29, 1991, President Aquino signed Republic Act 6975 into law, which changed the name of the SAF from PCSAF to PNPSAF as a part of transition of government.

In 2008, it was reported that the SAF moved to a permanent camp at Barangay Pinugay, Baras, Rizal under Proclamation No. 1355 passed in August 2007.

For the first time, SAF troopers were involved in the Balikatan exercises in 2009 since American and Filipino troops are usually involved.

On July 20, 2016, SAF created NBP Facility Security Provisional Battalion led by PSUPT Ledon Monte to take over from the Bureau of Corrections the duties to man the New Bilibid Prison, particularly in the Maximum Security Camp where big-time drug lords and hardened prisoners are held.

The PNP has approved the creation of five more Special Action Battalions to the SAF in 2017.

In 2019, the SAF witnessed the beefing-up of its Air Unit with the operationalization of 9 new helicopters (7 Airbus H125 and 2 Robinson R44 Raven II units). On June 29, 2021, the Air Unit was transferred to the Office of the Chief, PNP as prescribed under NAPOLCOM Resolution Number 2021-0720. This was in line in the PNP's 2020 Annual Report in an effort to ensure the force's organizational effectiveness, air support and mobility.

Known operations 

 February 1986: People Power Revolution.
 1986 to 1989 - SAF Conducted anti-coup operations against anti-government rebels from the Philippine military.
 Late 1980s to 1990s - First deployed to battle against NPA and MNLF rebels.
 May 1987 - Then PCSAF under MAJOR Avelino Razon, Jr was deployed in Ifugao to conduct operations against the CPP-NPA.
 1987 - Two Special Action Companies (SACs) were deployed in Negros Island and conducted successful operations against the NPAs. It caused the surrender of considerable numbers of the NPA operating in Negros Oriental. The 2SAC and 4SAC were led by 1LT Noli Talino (2SAC) and (4SAC)1LT Josephus Angan and 1LT Ramón Mateo Dizon, who later became Brigadier General and PSG Commander under President Benigno Aquino III.
 1992 - Newly created 4SAB under PSUPT Abraham Garcillano and PCINSP Emmanuel Caeg was placed attached with the Western Police District to assist in neutralizing criminal elements involved in robbery/hold-up of banks and pawnshops, including armored cars. 1SAC led by PINSP Adriático del Camat and PINSP Bernard Banac was deployed in Ermita, Manila, while the 2SAC led by PINSP Constancio Item and PINSP Bernardo Rosario was deployed in Sampaloc, Manila.
 1993 - The 3SAB was deployed in Basilan to go after notorious bandits and KFR groups.
 March 15, 1993 - A team of SAF Troopers led by PINSP Clemente Vargas and PINSP Bernardo Rosario discovered NPA killing fields in Brgy Kalabigan Hills, Marag Valley, Luna, Kalinga-Apayao.
 1994 - The 1SAB led by PCINSO Ager Ontog, 2SAB led by PCINSP Jaime Calungsod and Special Operations Battalion (SOB) Deep Reconnaissance Company (DEER) led by PINSP Bernard Banac and PINSP Rodolfo Castil, Jr replaced the 3SAB under PCINSP Bai Layon in Basilan with primary function to restore peace and order and conduct operation against the Abu Sayyaf.
 1994 - PSUPT Samson Tucay, Commander, SOB sent the Light Armor Coy "Bubuyog" led by PINSP Bernardo Rosario and PINSP Ramil Montilla to Zamboanga and Basilan to provide fire support to SAF units under the Mindanao Police Task Force (MPTF).
 1994 - PINSP Joseph Plaza and PINSP Parena were among those who headed the SAF Training Group in Basilan to conduct SAFOC.
 October 1994 - Two teams from 2SAB led by PINSP César Pasiwen and PINSP Cris Mendoza neutralized Commander "Arabain" in Tuburan, Basilan.
 October 1994 - The 1SAB was deployed in Region 12 with its Battalion HQ in Sultan Kudarat.
 October 1994 - The 1SAC, 1SAB under PINSP Willy Cayat backed by 2SAC under PINSO Tellio Ngis-o successfully took over the Malitubog-Maridagao Irrigation project from a Muslim rebel group led by Commander "Damskie". PINSP Victor Arévalo and other PNCOs were wounded during the operation. A bomb technician expert who was recovering/disarming anti-personnel mines was killed by a sniper fire.
 December 1994 - The 2SAC led by PINSP Ngis-o with Junior Officers PInsp Argel Ancheta, PInsp Jech Abecia, PInsp Chito Bersaluna, PInsp Kirby John Kraft, PInsp Ricardo Javier, PInsp Jacob Macabali, PInsp James Cristobal Coy Ex-O and PInsp Joel Limson, Chief of Police of Carmen MPS in Cotabato with support from 3SAC, successfully liberated the barangays of Tupig and Tonganon, Carmen, North Cotabato from the control of the Muslim rebel group that occupied the villages after they were displaced from Malitubog-Maridagao Dam. PO2s Ycoy and Pellobello who were part of the Blocking Force were killed in the said operations. The 2SAC, 1SAB was awarded as Best Operating Company by the Regional Police Office 12.
 June 1995 - Composite personnel from 1SAB, 2SAB, 3SAB,4SAB, SOB DEER COY led by PINSP Bernard Banac and PINSP Rodolfo Castil, Jr and SOB "Bubuyog" LAC, led by PINSP Bernardo Rosario and PINSP Ramil Montilla were deployed to Negros Island as primary component of Negros Island Police Task Force.
 September 1996 - The 3SAB under PCINSP Román Félix was deployed in SBMA-Bataan area to conduct clearing operations as part of security preparation for APEC. 31SAC was attached to 24th IB, Philippine Army under Major Emmanuel Bautista to conduct joint combat raids in the towns of Balanga and Orion, Bataan and nearby areas. It was transferred to Mauban, Quezon to support the local police.
 March 1995 - The RECON COY under PSINSP Ronald Santos was deployed to Nueva Ecija for election duty and was responsible for many accomplishments including the arrest of Mayor Joson and his 13 bodyguards, who were responsible for the killing of his political rival Mayor Pérez.
 1997 - The RECON COY under PSINSP Willy Cayat was deployed to Davao Del Norte at Mount Diwalwal to restore peace and order and conduct police operation against use of explosive components by miners in their operation of mining gold in Mount Diwalwal.
 1997 to 2000 - The 1SAB under PSUPT Benjamin Magalong figured in numerous special operations such as arrests and raids on high-profile lawless elements and hostage rescue operations in cooperation with Presidential Anti-Organized Crime Task Force (PAOCTF). Its Counter-Terrorist Unit also figured in series of raids against NPA that resulted in the neutralization of some of NPA leaders.
 August 4, 2000 two teams of SAF LRU of PAOCTF Luzon led by PSINSP Edgar Alan Okubo and PSINSP Félix Servita, Jr engaged eight fully armed robbers of the Danny Flores Gang after a hot pursuit operation in Alabang, Muntinlupa resulting in the killing of four suspects and arrest of four others and the recovery of six high powered long firearms and five handguns. One SAF trooper was KIA. 
 July 27, 2003 - SAF EOD experts were deployed to Makati during the Oakwood Mutiny.
 August 25, 2003 - SAF units were deployed in Makati after heavily armed bank robbers attacked the headquarters of Citibank Philippines.
 September 23, 2003 - A joint raid by the SAF, CIDG, Intelligence Group (IG), Traffic Management Group, Intelligence Service of the Armed Forces of the Philippines (ISAFP), Army Intelligence and Security Group (AISG) and Marines assaulted Palar Village in Taguig, netting a bank robbery gang made up of ex-Armed Forces soldiers believed to have been responsible for the earlier Citibank Philippines robbery.
 September 28, 2003 - SAF provided Quick Reaction Forces for protection of US President George W. Bush during his state visit to the country.
 October 2, 2003 - SAF arrested Jemaah Islamiyah terrorist Taofek Refke.
 March 10, 2004 - SAF teams engaged NPA guerrillas in a gunfight alongside soldiers of the Army's 24th Infantry Battalion at Sitio Caarosipan, Barangay Apóstol, San Felipe, Zambales. Eight NPA guerrillas were confirmed killed. A SAF officer was KIA, while three were WIA.
 April 28, 2004 - Arrest of Abu Sayyaf terrorists in the Muslim community in Culiat, Quezon City.
 March 18, 2004 - The SAF Commando Cl-27 composed the 24SAC, 2SAB who were deployed to North Cotabato (Buliok Complex) as requested by Governor Emmanuel Pinol to serve as a peace negotiator between the government and the MILF rebels. They also served as security during the 2004 presidential election in the province.
 May 31, 2004 - SAF protected ballot boxes used in the May 10 general election.
 June 11, 2004 - SAF teams were deployed in a resettlement area in Taguig, after reports of snipers were sent to the PNP.
 June 20, 2004 - A SAF officer was killed when SAF and the Zambales Police Provincial Mobile Group engaged the NPA in a firefight in Zambales.
 July 17, 2004 - A group of phone hackers, consisting of Filipino and foreign nationals, were arrested in a raid conducted by the SAF.
 July 28, 2004 - The SAF provided security for former Abu Sayyaf hostage Gracia Burnham who testified against said terrorist group in a local courthouse.
 September 27, 2004 - SAF teams were deployed in the Cordillera to disarm various Partisan Armed Group (PAG) gunmen in the employ of several local prominent politicians.
 January 30, 2005 - SAF arrested various members of a kidnap-for-ransom gang in Batangas City.
 February 10, 2005 - SAF arrested members of a bank robbery gang during a raid in the City of San Fernando, Pampanga.
 March 15, 2005 - SAF and NCRPO SWAT teams led by PSSUPT Benjamin Magalong raided the Metro Manila Rehabilitation Center of the Bureau of Jail Management and Penology in Camp Bagong Diwa, Taguig City after it was captured by Abu Sayyaf inmates. Among those killed were Alhamser Limbong (alias "Commander Kosovo"), Ghalib Andang (alias "Commander Robot"), Nadzmi Sabdullah (alias "Commander Global"), and Sadit Abdul Ganit Husim (alias "Commander Lando"). For a short time, various human rights group in the Philippines and abroad have accused the SAF of police brutality and were convinced that the PNP really wanted to kill them at the start of the crisis. PNP officials have denied all charges. Various foreign groups abroad (possibly other special ops units) have praised the SAF for bringing a quick end to the 30-hour crisis. This was one of the SAF's publicly known operations to be on the headlines on newspapers and on TV news reports worldwide, especially on CNN. PO1 Abel Arreola was the only SAF operative killed during the attack.
 February 17, 2006 - SAF units were deployed to Southern Leyte as part of a humanitarian contingent of the PNP.
 February 21, 2006 - SAF units patrolled the grounds of Malacañan Palace after an explosion within the palace complex. The explosive was said to have been placed in a waste bin.
 February 24, 2006 - SAF units were on red alert after a coup plot was uncovered.
 October 9, 2006 - SAF units were deployed to Negros Occidental after New People's Army rebels attacked the Silay City airport.
 January 11 to 14, 2007 - SAF units were deployed to Mandaue in Metro Cebu to protect heads of state and government gathered for the 12th ASEAN Summit.
 October 26, 2007 - PSINSP Fermar Ordiz, a PNP SAF operative, was shot and killed by robbers in Cubao, Quezon City during a shootout despite wearing a kevlar vest.
 November 29, 2007 - SAF helped in preventing the Manila Peninsula rebellion by arresting the renegade soldiers including Army BGEN Danilo Lim.
 June 13, 2007 - PO2 Marlon Buslig, a PNP SAF operative, was KIA by Abu Sayyaf members in Indanan, Sulu during a combat operation despite wearing a kevlar vest.
 December 5, 2008 - The Parañaque shootout between the SAF and the Waray-Waray gangs which led to death of 16 people, including one SAF member named PO1 Nixon Vinasoy. It was the most controversial mission conducted by the SAF due to the death of two civilians, including a 7-year-old girl, caused by the SAF team.
 September 26 to 30, 2009 - Heroic Acts of Special Action Force 61ST Calamity Assistance Rescue Recovery Relief and Emergency (CARE) Company of Force Support Battalion (FSB) under PCINSP Byron Tabernilla. On that day, the SAF Troopers of CARE manifested through actions their battle cry and mission statement "MAGHANAP-SUMAGIP-MAGLIGTAS". A huge number of people hit by Typhoon Ketsana, locally named as "Ondoy", were rescued around heaviy flooded parts of Metropolitan Manila such as Marikina. Among those rescued in Provident Village in Marikina were actress Cristine Reyes and actor Richard Gutiérrez.
 April 20, 2010 - Four SAF Troopers were KIA during an ambush by the NPA in Antipolo, Rizal while five other troopers were WIA.
 May 27, 2013 - Eight SAF Troopers were killed while seven other troopers were wounded during an ambush perpetrated by the NPA in Allacapan, Cagayan.
 September 9 to 28, 2013 - Zamboanga Siege - the 55SAC of 5SAB and 84SAC of RDB were among the first government troops to respond to the attack made by elements of a rouge MNLF faction. They prevented attackers from going further to the heart of the city. Three SAF Troopers, PO2 Christopher Hernáez of 55SAC and PO2s Lawin Salisa and Enrique Afable of 84SAC, were KIA. A total of 25 government troopers were KIA while 183 members of said faction were KIA and 292 others were captured. 
 January 25, 2015 - 44 members of the PNP-Special Action Force were killed by an estimated 800 members of Local Terrorist Groups, Bangsamoro Islamic Freedom Fighters, Moro Islamic Liberation Front and local criminal groups in Mamasapano, Maguindanao, while 12 other troopers were WIA. Among the 44 who were KIA, 35 were from 55SAC, 5SAB while nine from 84SAC, RDB. It was believed that an estimate of more than 200 LTGs were KIA due to the close proximity of the firefight although only 17 was reported. All 44 SAF Troopers were posthumously awarded the Medal of Valor.
 May 23, 2017 to October 23, 2017 - a Composite SAF Contingent was sent to augment government forces to clear Marawi City of an estimated 1,000 members of ISIS-inspired and combined Maute and Abu Sayyaf Local Terrorist Groups (LTGs). For five months, the contingent directly confronted the enemy at the Main Battle Area where they fought side by side with the elite forces of the AFP in neutralizing said LTGs. They provided Assault Teams, Sniper Teams, Weapons Teams, LAC Teams and Seaborne Teams. The contingent was led by PSUPT Rex Arvin Malimban. It was composed of personnel mostly from the CTU Companies of the line battalions such as 83SAC (CRG) and 84SAC (Seaborne) of the RDB led by PSUPT Lambert Suerte, 103SAC and 15SAC of 1SAB led by PSUPT Jack Angog, 25SAC of 2SAB led by PSUPT Mario Mayames, Jr, composite company mostly from 55SAC of 5SAB led by PSUPT Ledon Monte. 4SAB and SAFTB (Commando Cl-77 as test mission) also sent personnel. Four were KIA: PO3 Alexis Mangaldan (5SAB), PO1 Moises Kimayong (SAFTB), PO2 Alexis Laurente (1SAB) and PO2 Daniel Tegwa (SAFTB). For their gallantry in action, the four were awarded the Order of Lapu-Lapu's Kalasag Medal.
 October - November 2020 New Bilibid Prison riots - The SAF, together with the Philippine SWAT and the Bureau of Corrections, were instrumental in quelling a prison riot ignited by the infamous Sigue Sigue Sputnik gang.

Structure
As of 2021, the SAF's command structure consists of the following:

 Headquarters
 Force Support Battalion
 Rapid Deployment Battalion
 Twelve Special Action Force Battalions: 1SAB, 2SAB, 3SAB, 4SAB, 5SAB, 6SAB, 7SAB, 9SAB, 10SAB, 11SAB, 12SAB, 14SAB
 Training Branch

Training 
Prior to recruitment, prospective SAF candidates must be recruited into the PNP with the rank of Police Officer 1 (PO1), now Patrolman as of 2022. This would be followed by a six-month basic public safety course at the National Police Training Institute with field training done in the streets of the Philippines. The latter requirement was dropped as of 2018 because of concerns that new officers having field training would be exposed to bad and corrupt practices.

SAF candidates then need to attend the SAF Commando Course (or equivalent training such as Scout Ranger Course, Force Reconnaissance Course, Special Forces Operations Course) to be allowed to wear the SAF Beret. The course includes modules in internal security operations, waterborne rescue, police intervention, barangay module and operational testing, followed by a field training exercise.

After completing the command course, SAF operators are allowed to take specialized training such as explosives and ordnance disposal (EOD), Basic Airborne Course (BAC), Urban Counter Revolutionary Warfare Course (SURESHOCK), K-9 Training Course, Sniper Course, SCUBA-BUSROC (Basic Underwater Search and Rescue Operations Course), the maritime tactical operation course and the SAF Seaborne Warfare Course (SSWC). For MTOC, SAF operators must have SURESHOCK and Airborne qualifications before being considered.

Training occurs at the unit's headquarters in Cuartel de Santo Domingo, Santa Rosa, Laguna.

The SAF has conducted cross training with the 1st Special Forces Group. Training was also provided from the Hostage Rescue Team (HRT), Critical Incident Response Group (CIRG), RAID and Yamam.

Functions
As designated by the Philippine National Police, the missions of the Special Action Force are the following:

 To develop, organise and train organic personnel in the furtherance of the assigned mission.
 To conduct Counter-Terrorist operation in urban and rural areas.
 To conduct commando type unconventional warfare (CUW) against lawless elements over extended periods of time with minimal direction and control.
 To conduct search and rescue operations anywhere in the country during calamities and catastrophes.
 To conduct civil disturbance management (CDM) operations and address the requirements of stability and security operations in times of civil disobedience on a national scale.
 To operate as a rapid deployment force ready and capable to strike anytime and anywhere in the country in support of other units and other agencies as higher headquarters may direct.
 To perform other tasks as the Chief PNP may direct.
 To maintain a reasonable degree of law and order in the national highways and major thoroughfares

Equipment

Pistols

Submachine guns

Shotguns

Rifles and carbines

Designated marksman and sniper rifles

Machine guns

Grenade launchers and assault weapons

Mortars

Armored vehicles

Commanders
The list are the directors who had commanded the SAF.

References

External links
 Philippine National Police Special Action Force (SAF) official website (Current Site)
 Philippine National Police Special Action Force (SAF) official website (Last Archive on July 16, 2011)

Philippine National Police
Special forces of the Philippines
Non-military counterterrorist organizations
Non-military counterinsurgency organizations